The 2010–11 Israeli Women's Cup (Gvia HaMedina Nashim) was the 13th season of Israel's women's nationwide football cup competition.

The competition was won by ASA Tel Aviv University who had beaten Maccabi Holon 3–2 in the final.

Starting with this season, the IFA organized a league cup competition for the League’s second division. The winner of this cup was Hapoel Be’er Sheva, who had beaten Maccabi Kishronot Hadera B 7–1 in the final.

Results

First round

Quarter-finals

Semi-finals

Final

Gvia Ligat Nashim Shniya

Format
The five second division teams were split into two groups, north and south. The two regional winners met in the final. As Hapoel Acre forfeited its matches in the northern group, there was only one match in each regional group, acting as a semi-final.

Group stage

Northern group

Southern group

Final

Notes

References

External links
2010–11 State Cup Women Israeli Football Association 
2010–11 Ligat Nashim Shniya Cup Israeli Football Association 

Israel Women's Cup seasons
cup
Israel